The 19th British Independent Film Awards nominations were announced on 1 November 2016.

Awards

Best British Independent Film
American Honey
Couple in a Hole
I, Daniel Blake
Notes on Blindness
Under the Shadow

Best Director
Andrea Arnold - American Honey
Babak Anvari - Under the Shadow
Ben Wheatley - Free Fire
Ken Loach - I, Daniel Blake
Peter Middleton and James Spinney - Notes on Blindness

Best Actress
Sasha Lane - American Honey
Kate Dickie - Couple in a Hole
Narges Rashidi - Under the Shadow
Hayley Squires - I, Daniel Blake
Jodie Whittaker - Adult Life Skills

Best Actor
Dave Johns - I, Daniel Blake
Steve Brandon - My Feral Heart 
Michael Fassbender - Trespass Against Us
Shia LaBeouf - American Honey
Max Records - I Am Not a Serial Killer

Best Supporting Actress
Avin Manshadi - Under the Shadow
Gemma Arterton - The Girl With All the Gifts
Naomie Harris - Our Kind of Traitor
Terry Pheto - A United Kingdom
Shana Swash - My Feral Heart

Best Supporting Actor
Brett Goldstein - Adult Life Skills
Jamie Dornan - Anthropoid
Sean Harris - Trespass Against Us
Arinze Kene - The Pass
Christopher Lloyd - I Am Not a Serial Killer

Most Promising Newcomer
Hayley Squires - I, Daniel Blake
Steve Brandon - My Feral Heart 
Dave Johns - I, Daniel Blake
Sennia Nanua - The Girl with All the Gifts
Letitia Wright - Urban Hymn

The Douglas Hickox Award
Under the Shadow - Babak AnvariAdult Life Skills - Rachel Tunnard
Notes on Blindness - Peter Middleton and James Spinney
Prevenge - Alice Lowe
Trespass Against Us - Adam Smith

Best Debut ScreenwriterAdult Life Skills - Rachel TunnardThe Levelling - Hope Dickson Leach
Mindhorn - Julian Barratt and Simon Farnaby
The Passing - Ed Talfan
A Patch of Fog - John Cairns and Michael Lennox

Breakthrough ProducerThe Girl with All the Gifts - Camille GatinAdult Life Skills - Michael Berliner
The Hard Stop - Dionne Walker
Notes on Blindness - Mike Brett, Jo-Jo Ellison and Steve Jamison
Where You’re Meant to Be - Paul Fegan

Best ScreenplayUnder the Shadow - Babak AnvariAdult Life Skills - Rachel Tunnard
American Honey - Andrea Arnold
I Am Not a Serial Killer - Christopher Hyde and Billy O'Brien
I, Daniel Blake - Paul Laverty

Best Achievement in CraftRobbie Ryan - American Honey (cinematography)Shaheen Baig - Free Fire (casting)
Seb Barker - The Girl with All the Gifts (visual effects)
Joakim Sundström - Notes on Blindness (sound)
Paul Monaghan and Mat Whitecross - Supersonic (editing)

Best DocumentaryNotes on Blindness - Mike Brett, Jo-Jo Ellison, Steve Jamison, Peter Middleton, James SpinneyThe Confession: Living the War on Terror - Ashish Ghadiali, James Rogan
Dancer - Steven Cantor, Gabrielle Tana
The Hard Stop - George Amponsah, Dionne Walker
Versus: The Life and Films of Ken Loach - Rebecca O'Brien, Louise Osmond

Best Foreign Independent FilmMoonlight - Dede Gardner, Barry Jenkins, Jeremy Kleiner, Tarell Alvin McCraney, Adele RomanskiHunt for the Wilderpeople - Carthew Neal, Matt Noonan, Leanne Saunders, Taika Waititi
Manchester by the Sea - Lauren Beck, Matt Damon, Kenneth Lonergan, Chris Moore, Kimberly Steward, Kevin J. Wals
Mustang - Deniz Gamze Ergüven, Charles Gillibert, Alice Winocour
Toni Erdmann - Maren Ade, Jonas Dornbach, Janine Jackowski, Michael Merkt

Discovery AwardThe Greasy Strangler
Black Mountain Poets 
The Darkest Universe 
The Ghoul
Gozo

References

External links
 Website

British Independent Film Awards
2016 film awards
Independent Film Awards
2016 in London
November 2016 events in the United Kingdom